Charles Cadron (born 1889, date of death unknown) was a Belgian cyclist. He competed at the 1920 and 1924 Summer Olympics.

References

External links
 

1889 births
Year of death missing
Belgian male cyclists
Olympic cyclists of Belgium
Cyclists at the 1920 Summer Olympics
Cyclists at the 1924 Summer Olympics
Place of birth missing